Maxwell or Max Aitken may refer to:

 Max Aitken, 1st Baron Beaverbrook (William Maxwell Aitken, 1879–1964)
 Sir Max Aitken, 2nd Baronet (John William Maxwell Aitken, 1910–1985), briefly 2nd Baron Beaverbrook
 Maxwell Aitken, 3rd Baron Beaverbrook (Maxwell William Humphrey Aitken, born 1951)
 his son Maxwell Francis Aitken (born 1977), and his son Maxwell Alfonso Aitken (2014)

See also
Baron Beaverbrook